The CECRI (Centre d'Etude des Crises et Conflits Internationaux) is a research centre at University of Louvain (UCLouvain), Belgium.
Its central aim is to provide analyses and to conduct academic research on contemporary international crises and conflicts.
It currently hosts 19 research members, plus associates, and the current head is Prof. Amine Ait-Chaalal.

Research 
Research at CECRI is organized around three topics:
 Memory and conflict resolution
 International management of the conflicts in the 21st century
 Powers on the international scene: geopolitics and foreign policy
These research programmes are launched for a renewable period of five years. They guide the priorities of the CECRI's activity at every level (publication, networks, teaching...).

Teaching 
As a part of the School of political and social sciences of the faculté des Sciences Politiques, Economiques, Sociales et de Communication of the Université Catholique de Louvain, CECRI plays a role in the formation of the students in international relations.
 Master in political sciences: international relations
 Diplomacy and conflict resolution
 Humanitarian action (NOHA master)
 Certificate in international relations and conflict analysis (e-learning)
 Doctoral school and CECRI's seminars
 Preparation for the Belgian diplomatic competitive examination

Partnerships and international networks 
The CECRI is involved in the networks on international relations.
 CISMOC (Centre interdisciplinaire d'étude de l'Islam dans le monde contemporain)
 CERMAC (Centre d'étude et de recherche sur le monde arabe contemporain)
 Inbev - Baillet Latour chairs dedicated to the study of Russia and China
 NOHA (Network on Humanitarian Action)
 ROP (Francophone Research network on peace operations)

External links 
CECRI website

Research institutes in Belgium
Political research institutes
Université catholique de Louvain